Washington Township is one of eleven townships in Clay County, Indiana. As of the 2010 census, its population was 780 and it contained 335 housing units.

History
Indiana State Highway Bridge 46-11-1316 was listed on the National Register of Historic Places in 2000.

Geography

Unincorporated towns
 Bowling Green
 Hoffman Crossing
 Six Points
(This list is based on USGS data and may include former settlements.)

Adjacent townships
 Cass Township (north)
 Jackson Township, Owen County (northeast)
 Morgan Township, Owen County (east)
 Marion Township, Owen County (south)
 Harrison Township (southwest)
 Sugar Ridge Township (west)
 Jackson Township (northwest)

Major highways
  Indiana State Road 46

Cemeteries
The township contains six cemeteries: Fairview, Funk, Killion, Sixmile, Snoddy and Zenor.

References
 United States Census Bureau cartographic boundary files
 U.S. Board on Geographic Names

External links

 Indiana Township Association
 United Township Association of Indiana

Townships in Clay County, Indiana
Terre Haute metropolitan area
Townships in Indiana